Kuiter's deepsea clingfish (Kopua kuiteri) is a clingfish of the family Gobiesocidae, found only off southern Australia, at depths of between .

Etymology
The clingfish is named in honor of Australian underwater photographer Rudolf “Rudie” Kuiter (b. 1943), who collected the type specimen and provided color transparencies showing the fish's life coloration.

References

 
 Australian Museum Fish Site
 Hutchins, J.B. 1991. Description of a new deepwater clingfish (Gobiesocidae) from New South Wales. Records of the Western Australian Museum. 15(2): 463–468.

External links
 Fishes of Australia : Kopua kuiteri

Kuiter's deepsea clingfish
Fauna of New South Wales
Taxa named by J. Barry Hutchins
Kuiter's deepsea clingfish